Dalatagonum is a genus of beetles in the family Carabidae.

Species 
Dalatagonum contains the following fifteen species:

 Dalatagonum amariforme Fedorenko, 2018
 Dalatagonum anichkini Fedorenko, 2011
 Dalatagonum bidoupense Fedorenko, 2011
 Dalatagonum blattoides Fedorenko, 2011
 Dalatagonum broteroides Fedorenko, 2011
 Dalatagonum calathoides Fedorenko, 2011
 Dalatagonum convexicolle Fedorenko, 2018
 Dalatagonum ellipticum Fedorenko, 2011
 Dalatagonum elongatum Fedorenko, 2011
 Dalatagonum laticolle Fedorenko, 2018
 Dalatagonum quadrisetosum Fedorenko, 2018
 Dalatagonum rotundatum Fedorenko, 2018
 Dalatagonum rufipes Fedorenko, 2018
 Dalatagonum sericeum Fedorenko, 2011
 Dalatagonum simile Fedorenko, 2011

References

Platyninae